Kamal Paul, with the screen name Jeetu Kamal, is an Indian television and film actor known for his role as Satyajit Ray in Aparajito In 2022 film Aparajito.

Awards & nominations

Television

Filmography

References

External links
 
 

Living people
Place of birth missing (living people)
Indian male television actors
Indian male soap opera actors
Male actors from Kolkata
Year of birth missing (living people)
Bengali male television actors
University of Calcutta alumni
Surendranath College alumni